Rothmann is surname of:
 Bernhard Rothmann (c. 1495 – c. 1535) reformer and Anabaptist leader of Münster
 Christoph Rothmann (c. 1550/60 – 1600) German mathematician
 Max Rothmann (1868–1916), German neuroanatomist
 Maria Elizabeth Rothmann (1875–1975), Afrikaans writer
 Howard Rothmann Bowen (1908–1989), American economist
 Ralf Rothmann (b. 1953), German novelist and poet
 John Rothmann (b. 1949), a radio talk show host, and author

See also 
 Rothmann (crater)
 Rothman
 Rotman (disambiguation)
 Roitman
 Rottmann, Rottman
 Rottmanner
 

German-language surnames
Jewish surnames
Yiddish-language surnames